is a union passenger railway station located in the city of Ise, Mie Prefecture, Japan, operated by JR Central and the private railway operator Kintetsu Railway.

Lines
Iseshi Station is served by the JR  Sangū Line and is 15.0 rail kilometers from the terminus of theline at Taki Station. The station is also served by the Yamada Line, and is located 27.7 rail kilometers from the starting point of that line at Ujiyamada Station.

Station layout
Iseshi Station has a single island platform and a side platform serving the 3 tracks used by JR Central. The station is staffed. The Kintetsu portion of the station has two opposed side platforms.
JR Central station is responsible for the administration of the section between Tamaru Station and Toba Station. The Kintetsu station is administrated by Ujiyamada Station. All of the platforms are connected by a footbridge.

Platforms

Adjacent stations

History
The line was nationalized on October 1, 1907, becoming part of the Japanese Government Railway (JGR) network. The Sangū Electric Express Railway (later known as the Yamada Line) began operations on September 21, 1930. The station building was rebuilt in May 1950, and the Kitetsu portion in 1953. The station was renamed to its present name on July 15, 1959.

Passenger statistics
In fiscal 2019, the JR station was used by an average of 1260 passengers daily and they Kintetsu station by 4174 passengers daily (boarding passengers only).

Surrounding area
Ise Grand Shrine:  Outer Shrine
JR Central Iseshi train depot

See also
List of railway stations in Japan

References

External links

 Kintetsu: Iseshi Station 
 JR Central: Iseshi Station 

Railway stations in Japan opened in 1897
Railway stations in Mie Prefecture
Stations of Kintetsu Railway
Ise, Mie